Leucothoe may refer to:
 Leucothoe (mythology), the name of several characters in Greek mythology.
 Leucothoe (plant), a genus in the family (Ericaceae)
 Leucothoe (crustacean), a genus of amphipod crustaceans
 Leucothoé, an early work by the Irish playwright Isaac Bickerstaffe
 Leucothoe (poem), a poem by Giovanni Pascoli